Luton Airport Parkway railway station is on the Midland Main Line in England, serving south Luton and Luton Airport in Bedfordshire. Its three-letter station code is LTN, also the IATA code for the airport.

The station is served by Thameslink operated trains on the Thameslink route and by East Midlands Railway.

Luton DART, a light rail/people mover transit, links the station to the airport terminal.

History 
The Bedford–London section of the Midland Main Line was opened on 1 October 1868 by the Midland Railway to provide a new direct route into London St Pancras.

Luton Municipal Airport was opened on 16 July 1938 by the Secretary of State for Air, Kingsley Wood. During World War Two, the airport served as an RAF base for No. 264 Squadron RAF, but the airport returned to civilian use after the war. From the 1950s and 1960s, the airport's business increased with the growth of the package holiday market (later assisted by a popular 1977 television advert for Campari featuring Lorraine Chase which mentioned the airport). To support the increasing passenger traffic, Luton Airport provided a shuttle bus service from Luton to the airport terminal.

In 1999, Luton Airport Parkway was opened. Although it was designed specifically to serve Luton Airport, it was also given the parkway name, a title applied to British railway stations that have been designed as a park and ride railway station with motorists in mind, providing car parking facilities for commuters travelling onwards into London. Initially these were operated by National Car Parks on behalf of the airport's owners and provided passengers with a free transfer. In January 2008 the free shuttle bus service was replaced by a more frequent, but chargeable, service provided by First Capital Connect.

In November 2008, the station became the first on the Thameslink route to have its platforms extended in order to accommodate twelve-coach trains as part of the Thameslink Programme. In April 2013, a new northern entrance was opened on Kimpton Road, Luton.

Contactless bank cards (but not Oyster cards) became valid for journeys to and from London from October 2019.

Services

Rail services 

Services at Luton Airport Parkway are operated by East Midlands Railway and Thameslink using  and  EMUs.

The typical off-peak service in trains per hour is:

East Midlands Railway
 2 tph to London St Pancras International
 2 tph to 

Thameslink
 2 tph to  via 
 2 tph to Three Bridges via 
 2 tph to  via 

Luton DART 

Luton DART, a  light rail/ automated guided people mover line, provides a five-minute transfer between Luton Airport Parkway station and Luton Airport. The DART platforms are located in a terminus building above the Parkway station, connected to the main-line rail platforms via lifts and escalators and a footbridge. 

The transit was officially opened by King Charles III in December 2022. It opened to passengers on 10 March 2023 and is currently operating a limited service for four hours per day, with a planned 24-hour service coming into effect around the end of the month. When fully operational, the DART transit will replace the shuttle bus service.

The single fare for the DART is £4.90. Rail tickets marked "Luton Airport" include the price of the DART transit. Concessions are given to Luton residents, and free travel is provided for holders of concessionary travel passes and disabled blue badge holders, and for airport workers.

Bus services 

A frequent shuttle bus service has conveyed air passengers from the station to the airport terminal, but this is to be replaced by the Luton DART light rail transit, once the full service pattern is introduced. The shuttle bus journey takes 10 minutes, and buses run every 10 minutes during the day, and at night, buses connect with all trains calling at the station overnight. The single fare is £2.40, and the return fare is £3.80. Rail tickets "Luton Airport" include the bus fare.

Bus services on the Luton to Dunstable Busway Route A also connect Parkway to Luton Airport.

Station facilities 

 Four platforms
 Four waiting rooms
 Newsagent/Cafe
 Telephones
 ATM
 Ticket barriers
 FastTicket machine
 Toilets
 Multistorey car park
 Free 20 minute wait car park
 The station participates in the Plusbus scheme where train and bus tickets can be bought together for a cheaper price. It is in the same town as Luton and Leagrave stations.

References

External links 

Railway stations in Bedfordshire
DfT Category D stations
Buildings and structures in Luton
Railway stations opened by Railtrack
Railway stations in Great Britain opened in 1999
Railway stations served by East Midlands Railway
Railway stations served by Govia Thameslink Railway
Airport railway stations in the United Kingdom
Transport in Luton/Dunstable Urban Area
Luton Airport